Liu Wei (Chinese: 刘伟; born 7 January 1993) is a Chinese footballer who currently plays for as a centre-back for Nantong Zhiyun.

Club career
Liu Wei received organised football training in Jiangsu Youth. He entered  Nanjing University in 2009 and received his bachelor's degree of administration in the summer of 2015. He signed his first professional football contract after his successful trial at Jiangsu Sainty and was named in the reserve team of the club. He was promoted to Jiangsu Suning's first squad in 2016.  On 23 February 2016, Liu made his debut for Jiangsu Suning in the first 2016 AFC Champions League group stage match against Vietnamese team Becamex Bình Dương. He committed a foul to concede a penalty which was scored by Nguyễn Anh Đức, as Jiangsu Suning tied with Becamex Bình Dương 1–1.

In March 2018, Liu transferred to his hometown club Nantong Zhiyun in the China League Two. He would go on to gain promotion to the second tier when the club finished runners-up at the end of the 2018 China League Two campaign. He would go on to establish himself as a vital member within the team and captained the team as the club gain promotion to the top tier at the end of the 2022 China League One season.

Career statistics 
Statistics accurate as of match played 31 December 2022.

References

External links
 

1993 births
Living people
Chinese footballers
Footballers from Jiangsu
Sportspeople from Nantong
Jiangsu F.C. players
Nantong Zhiyun F.C. players
Chinese Super League players
China League One players
China League Two players
Nanjing University alumni
Association football defenders